Haselton is a surname, one of the earliest to be found among the Protestant pilgrims seeking religious freedom in America. The first documented instance of the Haselton surname in America dates back to 1640 A.D.

Notable people with the surname include:
Bennett Haselton (born 1978), American activist
Martie Haselton (born 1970), American psychologist
Rick Haselton (born 1954), American judge

See also
Haselton Icefall, icefall of Antarctica
Hazelton (disambiguation)

References